Seward's Day is a legal holiday in the U.S. state of Alaska. This holiday falls on the last Monday in March and commemorates the signing of the Alaska Purchase treaty on March 30, 1867. It is named for then-Secretary of State William H. Seward, who negotiated the purchase from Russia.

It should not be confused with Alaska Day, which marks the formal transfer of control over Alaska from Russia to the United States.

References

Annual events in Alaska
March observances
Monday observances 
Holidays and observances by scheduling (nth weekday of the month)
State holidays in the United States